Falivene is a surname. Notable people with the surname include:
 Agostino Falivene (died 1548), Italian bishop
 Carl Falivene (1927–2015), American football player and coach